Hanna-Barbara Gerl-Falkovitz (born 23 November 1945 in Oberwappenöst, Germany) is a German Catholic philosopher and author. She studies Catholic religious philosophy of the 19th and 20th centuries.

Biography

Education 
Gerl-Falkovitz studied philosophy, German Studies, and political science at the universities of Munich and Heidelberg from 1965 to 1971; she earned her doctorate from the University of Munich in 1971. In an interview in 2021, she said of this formative period in her life, "The theology of the 1960s, when I was studying in Munich, was not attractive for me: too much historical criticism, also in methodology, too much existentialism." By contrast, she explained, "In philosophy I learned to see the structures and objective orders of thinking and of the world, the contradictions of atheism, the senselessness of denying the truth. Also, the deep meaning of the objective world, that is much more than a construction of the human mind."

While she was the Director of Studies at Burg Rothenfels am Main from 1975 to 1984, she earned her Habilitation from the University of Munich in 1979, submitting a monograph on the theologian Romano Guardini.

Career 
From 1993 to 2011, she held the chair for Religious Philosophy and Comparative Religious Studies at the Technical University of Dresden. She gained considerable popularity at a university struggling with its Communist past by offering courses and lectures on Christian notions of reconciliation and forgiveness. 

Since 2011, she has been Director of the European Institute for Philosophy and Religion (EUPHRat) at the Pope Benedict XVI Philosophical-Theological University in Heiligenkreuz, Austria.

She is one of the editors of the 29-volume German edition of the collected works Romano Guardini and one of the editors of the 27-volume German edition of the collected works of Edith Stein (Edith Stein Gesamtausgabe, Verlag Herder). She is widely considered to be an expert on Ida Friederike Görres, and is the founder and vice president of the Gertrud von le Fort Society.

She was a delegate to the Synodal Way process of the Catholic Church in Germany. On February 22, 2023 – Ash Wednesday – she and three others resigned as delegates. In a statement, the four expressed concern about the "direction and the conduct" of the Synodal Way and they wrote that the process was “casting doubt on central Catholic doctrines and beliefs.”

Interviews with Gerl-Falkovitz appear frequently in German-language media; she is a frequent public speaker.

Personal life 
Hanna-Barbara Gerl-Falkovitz was married to Hans-Bernhard Wuermeling, a coroner, from 1995 until his death in 2019.

Views 
In her writings and numerous public appearances, Gerl-Falkovitz has often defended traditional Catholic teaching on marriage. She is opposed to abortion and has studied the philosophical background of the mentality that favors contraception and abortion.

She supports the Catholic teaching that ordination to the priesthood is for men only. In 2022, she criticized the German Synodal Way's call for women's ordination.

In 2019, Gerl-Falkovitz was one of over 200 professors worldwide who signed an open letter to the leaders of the Pontifical John Paul II Institute expressing "great concern" following the removal of Livio Melina and José Noriega from the Institute.

Awards 
Gerl-Falkovitz has received many awards for her work, including:

 2019: Josef Pieper Prize from the Josef Pieper Foundation
 2020: Edith Stein Prize of the Polish Edith Stein Society and the Edith Stein House (Dom Edyty Stein) in Wroclaw, Poland
 2021: Augustin Bea Prize from the Humanum Foundation
 2021: Ratzinger Prize from the Ratzinger Foundation
 2022: Pontifical Order of St. Sylvester

Works

Selected works on Catholic figures and theological topics

Volumes by Ida Friederike Görres, edited by Gerl-Falkovitz

Gerl-Falkovitz in English translation

References

External links

1945 births
Living people
Ludwig Maximilian University of Munich alumni
Heidelberg University alumni
21st-century German Catholic theologians
Philosophers of religion
Anti-abortion movement
Female critics of feminism
Academic staff of TU Dresden
Ratzinger Prize laureates